Lycomorpha desertus is a moth of the family Erebidae. It was described by Henry Edwards in 1881. It is found in the US state of Arizona.

References

 

Cisthenina
Moths described in 1881